Pedro Cordeiro is a masculine Portuguese name that may refer to:

 Pedro Cordeiro (fl. 1630), a Macanese soldier
 Pedro Cordeiro (b. 1963), a Portuguese tennis player